Jason Kato Geria (born 10 May 1993) is an Australian professional soccer player who plays as a defender for Melbourne Victory in the A-League and for the Australia national team.

Born in Canberra, Geria played youth football with the Australian Institute of Sport and Brisbane Roar youth before joining Melbourne Victory in 2012, where he made his professional debut and played for five years. He then joined Japanese club JEF United Chiba in 2018.

Early life
Geria was born in Canberra to Ugandan parents.

Club career

Youth
Geria's first youth club was Weston Creek SC in Canberra. He also played in Woden Valley's youth sides. Geria was a member of the Australian Institute of Sport football program before joining Brisbane Roar's youth team in 2011. He eventually became captain of the side in the National Youth League.

Melbourne Victory
On 29 November 2012, Geria was signed for Melbourne Victory by ex-Roar coach Ange Postecoglou. Despite often missing A-League games due to national youth team commitments, Geria became a regular first team player and was awarded the number 2 shirt, although it took him almost three years to score his first senior goal for the club, against Hume City in the 2015 FFA Cup Semi Final on 28 October 2015.

JEF United Chiba
In March 2018, Geria left Melbourne Victory and transferred to J2 League club JEF United Chiba for a $800,000 transfer fee.

Perth Glory
In March 2021, 3 months after leaving JEF United Chiba, Geria returned to Australia, joining A-League club Perth Glory on a contract for the remainder of the 2020–21 A-League season. In June 2021, he left Perth Glory at the conclusion of his contract.

Return to Melbourne Victory
In July 2021, Geria re-joined Melbourne Victory, ahead of the 2021–22 A-League season.

International career 
Geria played for Australia numerous times at youth level, including participating in the 2013 FIFA U-20 World Cup, and the 2016 AFC U-23 Championship.

Geria was first called up to the Socceroos by Ange Postecoglou (with whom he had played for at club level) in March 2016 for two 2018 FIFA World Cup qualification matches that month against Tajikistan and Jordan, but he didn't play any match.

He was called up for the Socceroos for two home friendlies against Greece in June 2016, and started in the first match. As he only represented Australia in friendlies, he is still eligible to represent Uganda.

Career statistics

Honours
Melbourne Victory
A-League Championship: 2014–2015
A-League Premiership: 2014–2015
FFA Cup: 2015, 2021

Individual
 PFA A-League Team of the Season: 2021–22

References

External links
Jason Geria profile MelbourneVictory.com.au

1993 births
Living people
Association football defenders
Australian soccer players
Australia youth international soccer players
Australia international soccer players
Australia under-20 international soccer players
Australian people of Ugandan descent
Australian Institute of Sport soccer players
Melbourne Victory FC players
JEF United Chiba players
Perth Glory FC players
A-League Men players
J2 League players
Sportspeople from Canberra
Soccer players from the Australian Capital Territory